The siege of Badajoz was a siege of the Spanish city of Badajoz in June and October 1705 during the War of the Spanish Succession. Both the June and October phases was conducted by an Anglo-Dutch force under Henri de Massue, Earl of Galway and François Nicolas Fagel on their advance into south-west Spain. However, the besiegers were forced to withdraw when cavalry reinforcements were sent by marshal René de Froulay de Tessé. The siege was renewed in October, but Galway lost an arm and Fagel again withdrew, meaning that the French were able to withdraw with all their guns. This failure caused Fagel to ask for his recall to the Netherlands.

References

Citations

Bibliography
 
Tony Jaques, Dictionary of Battles and Sieges: A-E, page 92

External links
http://4gatos.es/editorial/historia-badajoz-1705/

Badajoz
Badajoz
Badajoz
1705 in Spain
Badajoz
Badajoz